Dictyonissus is a genus of tropiduchid planthoppers in the family Tropiduchidae. There are at least two described species in Dictyonissus.

Species
These two species belong to the genus Dictyonissus:
 Dictyonissus griphus Uhler, 1876
 Dictyonissus nigropilosus Doering, 1939

References

Auchenorrhyncha genera
Articles created by Qbugbot
Elicini